The women's 65 kg (143 lbs) Light-Contact category at the W.A.K.O. World Championships 2007 in Belgrade was the third heaviest of the female Light-Contact tournaments being the equivalent of the light heavyweight division when compared to the Low-Kick and K-1 weight classes.  There were fifteen women from two continents (Europe and Oceania) taking part in the competition.  Each of the matches was three rounds of two minutes each and were fought under Light-Contact rules. 

One woman received a bye to the quarterfinal round because the tournament only had room for sixteen participants. The tournament was won by Slovenia's Sabina Sehic who defeated Austrian 2004 I.A.K.S.A. Light-Contact world champion Nicole Trimmel in the final by split decision.  Julia Göldner from Germany and Irena Kobosilova from the Czech Republic gained bronze medals.

Results

Key

See also
List of WAKO Amateur World Championships
List of WAKO Amateur European Championships
List of female kickboxers

References

External links
 WAKO World Association of Kickboxing Organizations Official Site

Kickboxing events at the WAKO World Championships 2007 Belgrade
2007 in kickboxing
Kickboxing in Serbia